Lakhra is a town and union council of Uthal Tehsil in Balochistan province, Pakistan. It is located at 25°51'54"N 66°27'6"E with an altitude of 12 metres (42 feet).

References

Union councils of Lasbela District
Populated places in Lasbela District

angharia